Doomsday devices, when used in fiction, are capable of destroying anything from a civilization to an entire universe, and may be used for the purpose of mutually assured destruction, or as weapons in their own right. Examples of such devices include the Death Star from the Star Wars film franchise, the "Doomsday Machine" seen in the original Star Trek television series, or the atomic-powered stone burners from Frank Herbert's Dune franchise.

Overview
Planet killers function in a variety of ways depending on the series. Weapons such as the Death Star and the titular ship in Lexx use a directed energy weapon capable of obliterating a planet in moments. In the game Spore, the Planet Buster is an antimatter bomb that is inserted in the center of the planet, causing the planet's core to split into countless fragments. Other weapons, such as the Shadow Planet Killer in Babylon 5 and Covenant warships in the Halo series, render a planet uninhabitable. The Shadow Planet Killer does so by firing missiles which burrow into the planet's core and detonate, causing planet-wide volcanic activity which renders the planet lifeless. Covenant warships use plasma weapons to superheat the surface of the planet; the crust is turned into a glass-like substance rendering it uninhabitable. In Star Blazers, missiles that can destroy a planet (and even a star) with a single hit exist.

Some devices can destroy entire star systems. Nova bombs in Andromeda, the Sun Crusher and Centerpoint Station in the Star Wars novels, and Dr. Tolian Soran's trilithium torpedo in Star Trek Generations, are all capable of causing a supernova, obliterating every planet in the Solar System.

Planet killers in fiction

Film and television

Andromeda

 All Commonwealth warships were equipped with a limited stock of "Nova-bomb" warheads for their missiles, one of which is sufficient to cause a star to nova, thus destroying its planets.

Babylon 5

 Babylon 5: The Lost Tales – Centauri Superweapons, hinted at by a dream sequence set 30 years in the future that Sheridan experiences. While only NYC is destroyed in the scene, it is implied that all of Earth gets wiped out.
 Shadow Planet Killer
 Vorlon Planet Killer

Beneath the Planet of the Apes

Alpha Omega Bomb - an ICBM worshiped by the underground dwellers. The missile contains a thermonuclear bomb with a cobalt casing. When launched it would result in an explosion hot enough to ignite the atmosphere, thus destroying the surface of the Earth.

Dr. Strangelove or: How I Learned to Stop Worrying and Love the Bomb

 The end of the film (when Dr. Strangelove's Doomsday Device is released) shows Dr. Strangelove exclaiming, "Mein Führer, I can walk!" (to the American President) before cutting to footage of nuclear explosions, with Vera Lynn and her audience singing "We'll Meet Again". This footage comes from nuclear tests such as shot "Baker" of Operation Crossroads at Bikini Atoll, the Trinity test, a test from Operation Sandstone and the hydrogen bomb tests from Operation Redwing and Operation Ivy. In some shots, old warships (such as the German heavy cruiser Prinz Eugen), which were used as targets, are plainly visible. In others, the smoke trails of rockets used to create a calibration backdrop can be seen. "The film is often considered one of the best comedies ever made, as well as one of the greatest films of all time." - Wikipedia: Dr. Strangelove

Lexx

 The Lexx – Capable of entirely destroying planets.
 The Foreshadow – predecessor of the Megashadow. Reduces the surface of Brunnis-2 into molten slag, using a large scale version of the "Black Pack" weapon often seen in the LEXX series.
 The Megashadow – Annihilates an Ostral-B asteroid base and the surrounding field in a single shot.
 Mantrid Drones – They consume all forms of matter (including planets) to replicate themselves.

DC Comics

 In Justice League: Crisis on Two Earths, the Quantum Eigenstate Device (QED) is a planet-killing or possibly universe-killing weapon.
Superman has demonstrated the strength to move or destroy multiple planets and once infamously destroyed a solar system with a sneeze; his heat vision also has vaporized entire planets. While Superman's depictions vary from author to author, these feats have appeared in every era of the character: the Golden, Silver, Bronze and Modern Age of comics.
 In Green Lantern: The Animated Series, the Red Lantern Corps have a large number of cylindrical devices called 'Liberators' that can disintegrate a planet.

Stargate SG-1/Stargate Atlantis

 A tainted Zero Point Module can explode with enough energy to destroy an entire star system.
 The Stargates themselves are composed of Naqahdah, and, if caused to detonate, would cause considerable damage.
Anubis's Ancient weapon that charges a Stargate powerfully enough that it explodes. However, its yield is stated to be two gigatons of TNT, not enough to kill a planet.
 A wormhole passing through a star is capable of introducing super-heavy elements into it, thus destabilizing fusion processes and changing, possibly catastrophically, the climates of planets orbiting it.
 P3W-451 has fallen into a black hole; an inbound wormhole to its stargate propagates the gravitational influence back to the dialing gate. Initially this caused time distortion effects near the gate, but as P3W-451 got closer to the black hole objects were pulled into the gate, as of "Exodus" a gate dialing from a star would exert such a pull that it could not only remove matter from the star, but do so fast enough to cause it to go supernova. The effect of dialing from a planet at this point was not described.
 The Dakara Superweapon in the Temple of Dakara can return all matter in its range to its component molecules. Its range is normally limited to Dakara and its surrounding space, however the wave will propagate through the wormhole of an active Stargate (unimpeded by either iris or Goa'uld shield technology) and expand on the far side to cover the planet's surface, but unlike Dakara itself, the wave will not propagate into orbit. Ba'al however modified the Dakara Stargate, using a 'hack' of the DHD's correlative update function to dial every Stargate in the galaxy simultaneously, turning the weapon from a strategic threat to a galactic scale superweapon against all planets within the Milky Way Stargate network.
 A Tauri Mark 9 Naqahdah-enhanced nuclear weapon has a "Multi Gigaton" yield.
 Anubis's mothership, powered with the Eye of Ra as well as four other "eyes", in "Full Circle"
 The Asgard managed to destroy Halla by causing Halla's sun to become a black hole.
 The Asgard destroyed their home planet, to commit mass suicide, by unknown means.
 The Ori Priors can turn planets into Point Singularities (black holes) to power their supergates, and did so twice.
 The Tok'ra have been shown to possess thermonuclear induction explosives capable of burrowing to a planet's core and igniting a reaction to which the planet would explode; as shown when they used it to destroy Netu. "The Devil You Know".
 Gadmeer terraforming ship – see Genesis device below.

Star Trek

General Order 24 (see below) indicates that all Federation starships of cruiser size or above were capable of being planet killers by sustained use of conventional weapons to thoroughly bombard a planet.

The Original Series

 The Doomsday Machine
 General Order 24. Starfleet order for a starship to destroy all life on an entire planet, dialogue indicated conventional weapons were targeted to systematically destroy anything on the surface.
 Nomad. A small spacecraft resulting from the combination of two unrelated craft that was able to "sterilize" entire planetary populations.
 "The Amoeba", a giant space-dwelling single-cell life form capable of annihilating an entire star system

The Animated Series

 A space-dwelling life form that consumes planets for food

Star Trek: The Next Generation

 Tox Uthat, a weapon from the future that would stop all fusion reactions in a sun.
 Dr. Timicin's torpedo, intended to rejuvenate a dying sun but causing it to go nova instead.

Star Trek: Deep Space Nine

 A bomb consisting of trilithium, tekasite and protomatter intended to be detonated in the Bajoran sun by a Changeling
 A combined Romulan and Cardassian fleet performed a bombardment using conventional weapons and destroyed 30 percent of the planet's crust in the first barrage, essentially their version of General Order 24 ("The Die Is Cast").

Star Trek: Voyager

 Species 8472 bio-ships can focus their beam weapons onto a central bigger bio-ship and destroy a planet with a single sustained blast.

Star Trek: Enterprise

 The Xindi superweapon was a mobile directed energy weapon that could reduce a planet to molten rubble.

Star Trek (movies)

 V'Ger, a highly advanced and powerful living machine evolved from the Earth space probe Voyager VI, was capable of destroying the entire surface of a planet with plasma-based torpedo-like devices. It was also capable of using these devices to reduce ships and space stations into digital patterns, destroying the originals in the process.
 Genesis Device: A terraforming experimental device; not intended as a weapon, but when it was used on an existing biosphere it destroyed it in the process of creating a new one. The process left the planet unstable and it eventually exploded due to a flaw in the terraforming.
 Trilithium torpedo. Used by Dr. Tolian Soran in Star Trek Generations to stop all the fusion reactions in a star, causing it to go nova, much like the Tox Uthat.
 Red Matter. A material capable of creating black holes. It could be used as a planet-killer by being injected into a planet's core, creating a black hole that imploded the planet by consuming it from the core outward. Red Matter is also potentially strong enough to consume a star. An example of a ship that used this is Spock's ship, the Jellyfish. The Romulan mining ship Narada also used the supply on Spock's ship when they captured it (Star Trek (2009)).

Star Trek novels

 Planetcracker weapons and sunkiller bombs (Diane Duane's novels)

Star Wars

 Imperial Star Destroyer: All Imperial Star Destroyers, later re-envisioned as Imperial-class Star Destroyers, were capable of glassing a planet's surface (melting the planet's surface so that later it was frozen as a glass-like rock) although this method took months and sometimes years. This command was known as Base-Delta-Zero. 
 Centerpoint station (Star Wars expanded universe): An ancient space station, capable of moving planets with its tractor beams.
 Galaxy Gun (EU): A gigantic space cannon, firing warheads in hyperspace that reverted to normal speed near the target. The special chemicals in the warhead reacted in the planet's core, destabilizing the planet.
 Mass Shadow Generator (EU): Used the gravity of a planet to create a quantum singularity, de-stabilizing the planet.
 Eclipse-class dreadnought (EU): A Super Star Destroyer armed with a less-powerful version of the Death Star superlaser.
 Naga Sadow: The Sith Lord Naga Sadow was capable of using ancient Sith sorcery to manipulate solar flares. His immense power with this ability was used to turn the Denarii Nova into a supernova, effectively destroying the entire system.
 Sovereign-class Super Star Destroyer (EU): A less-powerful version of the Eclipse.
 Sun Crusher (EU): A starfighter-sized ship, armed with a torpedo capable of making a star go supernova.
 World Devastator (EU): Ships which consumed the material of a planet, using the material to create new war machines (utilizes tractor beams).
 Death Star: A moon-sized battle station, armed with a superlaser capable of destroying an entire planet.
 Darth Nihilus (EU): Fed off entire planets, destroying all life on them.
 Starkiller Base: A First Order planet-converted superweapon capable of destroying an entire star system.
 Yo'gand's Core (EU): A Yuuzhan Vong tactic to destroy a planet, using a 'dovin basal' (an organism capable of manipulating a planet's gravity) deployed in the planet's surface to disrupt a moon's orbit, causing it to crash into the planet.
 Mandator IV–class Siege Dreadnought: A First Order siege dreadnought, inspired by the Imperial dreadnoughts, the Eclipse, Executor and Sovereign Star Dreadnoughts. It possessed the firepower of a dozen Resurgent-class Star Destroyers, and had two orbital autocannons used for large-scale bombardments. The project by Kuat-Entralla Engineering was used as a test project to inform the Xyston-class Star Destroyers, revealed to be constructed by the Sith Eternal in secret on Exegol.
 Sith Star Destroyer: A model of Star Destroyer used by the Sith Eternal, that in place of the hangar, possesses an axial superlaser, capable of destroying entire planets. It is revealed in The Rise of Skywalker. Darth Sidious reveals the Sith Eternal's fleet of Xyston-class Star Destroyers, the Final Order, intending to stage attacks on all free worlds.

Doctor Who

 In The Dominators the villains of the title try to destroy the peaceful planet Dulkis, as a fuel source for their fleet, by sending a seed device into the planet's core.
 The Pirate Planet materializes around other planets, destroying them.
 Additionally, the Daleks and Time Lords have both been shown to be capable of moving planets, and would thus be capable of relocating a planet into a star, nova, black hole, or other inhospitable location that would destroy it. Image of the Fendahl reveals the Time Lords trapped the world of the Fendahl, fifth planet of the Solar System, in a time loop. In The Trial of a Time Lord it is revealed the Time Lords devastated Earth with a fireball and moved it two light-years around 2,000,000 AD. Daleks have also been stated to have been responsible for the destruction of The Doctor's home planet of Gallifrey, planet of the Time Lords, though at other points in the series the impression is given that the world has, rather, been removed from reality. It is later claimed the Doctor destroyed his world to end the Time War using 'The Moment', thinking it would destroy the Daleks. The Daleks have shown themselves to be capable of destroying planets; in "Asylum of the Daleks" they destroy the Dalek Asylum with an attack from space. In The Daleks' Master Plan the First Doctor uses their weapon, the Time Destructor, against them, turning the jungle planet of Kembel into a desert. In "Journey's End" Davros and the Daleks attempt to destroy all universes with the Reality Bomb, which breaks down matter and is transmitted using stolen planets that include Earth.
 In "The End of the World", technology is shown holding the Earth together and preventing the sun from exploding, and thus the Earth is destroyed simply by deactivating this technology.
 In "The Big Bang" the TARDIS nearly destroys the Universe when it explodes by unexplained means in "The Pandorica Opens".
 The Hand of Omega can be used to destroy planets by manipulating stars, as demonstrated on the Dalek homeworld Skaro.
 The Osterhagen Key detonates 25 nuclear weapons in strategic points under the Earth's crust, causing it to rip apart. Only be used if "Humanity were suffering unbearably, with no hope or help ever coming..." in "The Stolen Earth" and "Journey's End".
 The Tenth Planet, set in 1986, features the Z-Bomb, a weapon that could destroy the Earth, at a South Pole base. There are apparently others at strategic positions around the world. The General commanding the base tries to use it to destroy the planet Mondas, while its inhabitants the Cybermen try to use it to destroy Earth as Mondas is absorbing too much energy from Earth, which eventually destroys it.
 In "Remembrance of the Daleks" The Doctor explains that the Dalek mothership "has weapons that could crack this planet like an egg."

Other film and television
 In The Hitchhiker's Guide to the Galaxy franchise, the Vogon Constructor Fleet "demolishes" Earth as a contractor would demolish buildings to make way for a new construct.
 In John Carpenter's sci-fi film Dark Star, intelligent and philosophically capable "Exponential Thermostellar Bombs" are used to destroy "unstable planets" which might threaten future colonization.
 In the Mel Brooks feature film spoof Spaceballs, the Spaceballs' starship, Spaceball One, is capable of transforming into "Mega Maid", a robot maid in the shape of the Statue of Liberty holding a giant vacuum cleaner, which can suck the air from an entire planet and thus make it uninhabitable.
 In the film The Chronicles of Riddick, the Necromongers cull potential recruits from planets and kill all those who remain on the surface by executing their "Final Protocol", a series of gravity-based weapons that flatten everything on the surface of the planet, save for the series of monuments that produce them.
 Hugo Drax's space station in Moonraker, which launches globes filled with poisonous gas that would have wiped out mankind.
 "Q Bomb" from Starship Troopers 3: Marauder
 Unicron, a robotic, predatory planet from the animated feature film The Transformers: The Movie. Unicron is a rarity among the planet killers on this list in that he is one of the few which is sentient and can act and think for himself.
 "Blue Harvest", a Family Guy episode spoofing the original Star Wars movie, contains a version of the Death Star which is armed with a "planet blower-upper gun".
 In the Futurama episode "I Dated a Robot", Fry blows up a planet with a planet blowing-up machine. Also in Futurama: The Beast with a Billion Backs, a weapon is used in a duel between Bender and another robot, Calculon, called a "Planetary Annihilator". Throughout there are also numerous references to Professor Farnsworth's doomsday devices which are hinted at being powerful enough to destroy planets or more.
 In the British sci-fi series The Tomorrow People, an alien race known as the Thargons have a weapon known as a "Ripper Ray" which is allegedly capable of destroying a planet.
 In the Kurt Russell film Soldier, one portable explosive device nicknamed a Planet Killer is used, devastating the planet.
 In the Roger Corman film Battle Beyond the Stars, the evil Sador's mothership has a planet killing superweapon called the Stellar Converter, which seems to have the effect of superheating the core of the planet, causing a delayed explosion where it incinerates from the inside/out.
 In the TV series Earth: Final Conflict, the Jaridians have a planet killer and have destroyed thousands of Taelon-occupied planets including their homeworld. The video archive of all the planets destroyed one after another is seen by William Boone but at the time he doesn't understand what it is until the circumstances are explained to him later by Da'an.
 In the science fiction feature film The Core, Project DESTINI was designed as a tactical weapon, but had the unforeseen effect of ceasing the rotation of the Earth's magnetic core, causing catastrophe, and threatening to end all life on Earth, unless the rotation could be restarted.
 In the science fiction feature film Men in Black II, Serlena's ship is seen making vengeful blasts on searched planets, causing an icy one to shatter and another to implode.
 The Displacement Engine in the TV series Farscape is a device which employs a wormhole to draw a large mass of fusing plasma from the core of a star, and then deploys it against a target. The device is described as being able to destroy a solar system. A major plot of the series is that the knowledge of wormholes contained in the head of John Crichton can be used to create a planet-killing weapon; in Farscape: The Peacekeeper Wars Crichton finally builds and activates such a weapon to show that it is much worse; it is in fact a galaxy-killer. Under threat of everyone being consumed by the weapon, he convinces the Peacekeepers and Scarrans to pursue peace negotiations in return for him turning it off.
 In the German TV series Raumpatrouille, a weapon called Overkill was used to destroy an object the size of a planetoid. The explosion seems to be strong enough to destroy a planet as well.
 Blue-colored bomb with small red spheres floating around inside. Consisting of a three-dimensional matter shell and a ninth-dimensional matter inside. Featured in Supernova (2000).
 The Drej Mothership in the animated feature film Titan A.E. destroyed Earth.
 The Megas XLR episode "Breakout" features a gigantic alien known as "Grrkek the Planet Killer".
 In the episode "Doomsday Is Tomorrow" of the series, The Bionic Woman, Jaime Sommers attempts to stop a doomsday device set up by a scientist who wants an end to nuclear weapons testing; while she and a Soviet agent race to get the job done, a Middle Eastern leader, skeptical of the claim of such a device, proceeds with his nation's first nuclear weapon test as an atmospheric explosion.
 In Ben 10: Alien Force, the Incursean race has a super weapon called the "Incursean Conquest Ray", which Emperor Milleous uses to destroy Pluto and threaten to use against Earth should Princess Attea not be returned. When Princess Attea overthrows her father, however, she plans to use it to destroy Earth, though Ben and his team are ultimately able to stop her.
 In Ben 10: Omniverse, the Contumelia used a device known as the Annihilargh to eliminate their enemies. Legends said that activating the Annihilargh will cause an entire universe to be wiped out. 
 In the French animated TV series Once Upon a Time... Space, the androids of the planet Yama use ships that connect themselves to form a much larger one, that fires a laser with enough firepower to destroy a planet.
 In Spaced Invaders the D.O.D. (Doughnut Of Destruction) is a ring-shaped device which the aliens claim would destroy Earth but leave them unharmed as they would be in the center of the blast. Upon activation the device fails to detonate, but instead falls apart, having been improperly assembled.
 The Illudium PU-36 Explosive Space Modulator in the classic Bugs Bunny short Haredevil Hare in 1948. Marvin the Martian wanted to use it to blow up Earth because, as he said, "It obstructs my view of Venus". The explosive was in the form of a small red stick that resembled dynamite that was screwed into a large telescope-like machine.
 The Sun Harvester in Transformers: Revenge of the Fallen. This is hidden inside one of the pyramids in Egypt and uses the Matrix to power up, destroying the sun to turn it into energon.
 In the tokusatsu kaiju film Ghidorah, the Three-Headed Monster, King Ghidorah attacked Venus (Mars in the English dub), leaving the planet uninhabitable. A variant version of King Ghidorah from the Rebirth of Mothra film trilogy sees the creature wiping out all dinosaurs on Earth, effectively acting as a planet killer in this respect, though life returns to the planet, and is eventually dominated by humanity. In the Monsterverse film Godzilla: King of the Monsters, the creature is capable of creating massive superstorms which, had the creature not been killed by Godzilla, would have rendered Earth effectively uninhabitable by anyone save itself, as it is stated the creature intended to reshape to the planet to suit its own needs. King Ghidorah, like Unicron (listed above), stands out from others on this list for being a living creature, something few other planet killers on this list have in common with it.
 In the British science fiction series Space: 1999 season 2 opening episode, "THE METAMORPH", Commander Koening orders General Order Four, which Tony Verdeschi reveals is "a coded signal to destroy the place it originated from", and subsequently launches an Eagle, what the villain of the episode Mentor reveals as "A Robot Device, designed to destroy Psychon". One can assume that the Eagle was heavily equipped with nuclear charges, sufficient enough to at least destroy life on the planet.
 In Green Lantern: The Animated Series, the Red Lantern Corps ship, dubbed Shard, carried giant monolith-shaped devices called "Planet Killers" that were bombs capable of destroying entire planets.
 The Dark Heart from Justice League Unlimited. A WMD from an unknown civilization, this robotic entity is sent to an enemy world, where it will consume any materials around it, until it consumes the entire planet. This war machine was never deactivated, so it continued to consume planets until it was stopped on Earth by the Justice League.
 In The Day the Earth Stood Still, the robot Gort is capable of destroying the Earth, according to Klaatuu. 
 Plan 9 from Outer Space mentions the Solaronite, a weapon so devastating that if detonated it could "explode the atoms of sunlight" and destroy the universe. It is implied that humanity will inevitably discover how to make the Solaronite unless prevented by aliens.
 "The Ball", an episode of the Disney animated series Wander Over Yonder, introduces The Worldbuster, abbreviated as Buster - a playful, space-dwelling puppy who is bigger than a planet and does not realize that the balls he likes to play with are inhabited worlds. The only solution for the inhabitants of these worlds is to colonize the surface of Buster himself, which turns out to be congenial for life.
 In The Tick, there was the Galactus parody Omnipotus.
 In the Marvel Cinematic Universe, Thanos acquires the Infinity Gauntlet, which has the power to eradicate half of all sentient life in the universe once he acquires all six Infinity Stones, adds them to the Gauntlet and snaps his fingers with it, as demonstrated in the 2018 film Avengers: Infinity War.
 In the episode of The Simpsons, "You Only Move Twice", Hank Scorpio threatens the United Nations with his doomsday device, testing it out on the 59th Street Bridge.

Literature 
The Deplorable Word, as used in The Magician's Nephew, by author C. S. Lewis, is a magical curse which ends all life in the fictional world of Charn except that of the one who speaks it (see Omnicide).
 Obliterators used by Honored Matres in Frank Herbert's Chapterhouse: Dune (1985) and later sequels by other authors are capable of combusting the entire atmosphere of a planet, and ultimately its full surface.
 Stone burners, a type of nuclear weapon which could potentially destroy a planet by burning into and destroying a planet's core in the Dune universe.
 Vogon Constructor Fleets in The Hitchhiker's Guide to the Galaxy. Vogon civil services are not only able to demolish entire planets, but have means and cause to do so regularly (to create and maintain hyperspace by-passes). The Earth falls victim to one such fleet in the beginning of the story to make way for a hyperspace expressway. The radio, book, and the 1981 TV series versions of the story refer to demolition beams, though the mechanism is not shown distinctly in the 2005 film. There is also the ultimate weapon designed by Hactar (a giant space-borne computer). It is a very small bomb that when activated will join the heart of every major sun with the heart of every other major sun, turning the universe into one gigantic hyperspatial supernova. The weapon was designed for a race of extinct aliens but was taken up again by the inhabitants of the planet Krikkit so as to wipe out all other life in the universe and permit them to be the only remaining inhabitants. Also, the Krikkit Battleclubs can destroy major suns with their hypernuclear grenades. Lastly, although not typically considered part of the main five-book trilogy, the short story "Young Zaphod Plays It Safe" mentions Zaphod passing by the doors of rooms filled with chemical and other agents that could sterilize, irradiate, explode, et cetera a planet; he then remarks that he is therefore glad he is not a planet.
 The Inhibitor machines from Alastair Reynolds' Revelation Space series of novels, were capable of consuming worlds over time to convert to copies of themselves, or to create weapons capable of utilizing stars to destroy planets, e.g. venting stellar core material in a collimated beam to burn away planetary crusts. In the same series, the "Greenfly" machines, developed by humans as terraformers, instead go rogue and start eating planets by reducing them to their atoms and rebuilding them into more such machines, as well as numerous domes filled with vegetation.
 The Spacer nuclear reaction intensifier in Isaac Asimov's Robots and Empire (1985)
 Stephen Baxter's Moonseed: a virus-like microscopic object (or substance made from it) that transforms substances into more copies of itself – and thus consumes Venus and then the Earth by doing so. (Baxter has also employed geomagnetic storms (see Sunstorm) and larger universal constructors (see Evolution) as planet killers.)
 In Stephen Baxter's Xeelee Sequence, the Xeelee have a handgun-sized weapon capable of destroying stars and neutron stars. Also, during their final war with humanity from 700,000 AD, the Xeelee built giant Dyson shells around every star in the Milky Way, which forces the human inhabitants of the worlds to flee as the planets freeze.
 The glass clock built in Terry Pratchett's Discworld novel Thief of Time was effectively a doomsday device, although its intended effect was to permanently freeze time on an entire world, rather than outright destroying it.
 The Neutronium Alchemist (Peter F. Hamilton's The Night's Dawn Trilogy)
 Quantumbusters in Peter F. Hamilton's Commonwealth Saga
 At least six methods in E. E. "Doc" Smith's Lensman saga:
 "super-atomic bombs"
 rendering a planet "loose" (inertialess) and directing it into a star
 a "nutcracker", maneuvering two loose planets to crush a third
 a "negasphere," an antimatter planet
 "Nth space planets" from other dimensions which travel at superluminal speeds and can be used to ram planets or stars (creating supernovas) – there was even the worrying possibility that these could cause the Big Crunch in zero time
 a "sunbeam", a way of concentrating most of a sun's energy output into a narrow beam—this one a defensive-only weapon against nutcrackers and negaspheres
 Of these, the Nth-space planet is considered the most lethal as its speed and inter-dimensional nature leaves no means to defend against it; this knowledge precipitates the final battle in Children of the Lens.
 Device Ultimate in The Xenocide Mission
 In Kevin J. Anderson's Saga of Seven Suns, the ongoing war between the Faeros and Hydrogues see entire suns having their cores frozen.
 In Orson Scott Card's Ender's Game, the MD (Molecular Disruption) Device, or "Little Doctor", generates a field inside in which it is impossible for atoms to coexist in a molecule. The field propagates in a chain reaction, and essentially destroys all matter until it reaches pure space. This was intended for ship to ship combat, but was eventually used to destroy an entire planet.
 In Daniel Edward's Division, planet-eaters focus gravity onto a planet, ripping it apart. This technology is used on Earth, destroying it utterly. Several other planet killers are mentioned
 In E. E. Smith's The Skylark of Space series various planet-killers are used or discussed. Throwing planets and moons out of orbit, incredibly high-yield atomic or copper bombs, near-instantaneous dematerialization of physical objects and the teleporting of close to fifty billion stars in order to wipe out a Galaxy-wide alien civilization are all used.
 In Greg Bear's The Forge of God, alien aggressors inject two high-mass weapons made of neutronium and antineutronium into the Earth which orbit the Earth's core until they meet and annihilate, destroying the planet.
 L. Ron Hubbard's Battlefield Earth (1982) planet-buster tactical nuclear weapons are teleported to a distant planet, where they are contained in a protective force-field that directs the blast into the mined-out and somewhat hollow planet. It first causes apocalyptic volcanic activity as half of the bombs' force breaks the crust and reaches the core, and the rest creates such temperature and pressure that it undergoes nuclear fusion and becomes a star. Battlefield Earth also features a device known as the "Psychlo ultimate bomb", which, when activated, causes all matter it touches to break down into hydrogen atoms (technically fission, although there is no mention of release or absorption of energy). The device featured at its core a sphere of extremely dense metal with an atomic number considerably larger than any listed on any periodic table of elements. This device was used on a moon, which was consumed faster than ships based on that Moon could launch. The resulting cloud of hydrogen later compressed under its own gravity, analogous to a gas giant planet. It is implied that it developed electron degeneracy, as it was described as having an electric field of "uncountable quintillions of megavolts" and would vaporize anything that approached it with an electric arc.
 In the Gor novel series by John Norman, specifically Tribesmen of Gor, the alien Kurii deploy a weapon, apparently housed in a small space craft, to the eponymous planet. If it had been put to use, it would have to have rendered the planet uninhabitable not only to humans, but also to the Priest-Kings, who were sheltered deep inside a mountain range.
 Nova Bombs (Starship Troopers)(Andromeda TV Series)
 Relativistic projectiles (Charles Pellegrino and George Zebrowski's The Killing Star)
 The Electron Pump (Isaac Asimov's The Gods Themselves). Not precisely a weapon per se; the destruction it produces is a side effect (albeit one the creators are aware of and consider acceptable, since it will also produce a great deal of usable energy).
 The Dahak-class Planetoid-of-the-Line (David Weber's Heirs of Empire trilogy)
 Two of David Weber's books
—The Armageddon Inheritance and The Shiva Option
—feature inhabited planets' biospheres destroyed by the impact of asteroids or moons on deliberately modified intersecting orbits.
 Throughout David Weber's Honorverse series just about any warship has the potential to wipe out all higher life on a planet by kinetic bombardment and this has happened in the past.
 S.T.A.R Platforms (The Blank Horizon), originally used for faster than light communication by artificially generating a molecule-sized wormhole, are capable of focusing over 1000 km square of a star's surface output into a beam a little over 2 cm wide, reaching temperatures in excess of 4.2 billion degrees, which could theoretically cut a planet apart and combust its atmosphere. This is never put into practice however, as the platforms are self-destructed to prevent them from being captured and used against their creators.
 In the Looking Glass series by John Ringo and Travis S. Taylor, the alien Dreen possess an explosive powerful enough to destroy planets, and the alien black box starship drive will generate a field capable of destroying entire star systems if exposed to high voltage electricity.
 The Demolio is a bomb which can shatter planets in Brian Herbert's Timeweb Chronicles.
 The Supernova (Matthew Reilly's Temple): A weapon based on a fictional radioactive element. The weapon was described to be able to destroy a third of the mass of the planet. The element used as the core of the device is only found, rarely, in meteorites
—only one active sample has ever been found and is being pursued by the American military and several terrorist organizations.
 Ice-nine in the novel Cat's Cradle by Kurt Vonnegut is a solid form of water at ambient temperature. It causes the end of the Earth when some of it falls into the ocean, causing a chain reaction that transforms all the water on Earth into ice-nine.
 Quark bombs in the novel Lord from the Planet Earth by Sergey Lukyanenko. A group of radical cultists from another planet wanted to destroy Earth with a quark bomb, but are foiled by the protagonists.
 The Q-bomb, a prototype doomsday device that could destroy the world if triggered in The Mouse That Roared, a 1955 novel by Irish American writer Leonard Wibberley.
 In Chris Walley's Lamb Among the Stars novels, a polyvalent fusion bomb is capable of rendering a planet inhospitable due to radiation if detonated in a solar system. Project Daybreak was intended to inject one into the core of a star, with an estimated blast radius of several dozen light-years.
 In M. Andrew Sprong's book Haley Cork and the Blue Door two forms of planet killers are employed. In one case the Enemy uses an anti-mercury bomb to destroy half of the planet's population in order to blind the sensors of its guardian moon. In another, Haley, as a personified biomechanical weapon, teleports billions of copies of herself using quantum foam technology to the same exact location in order to convert herself into a blackhole and destroy the Enemy's planetary armada.
 The Berserker series is a series of space opera science fiction short stories and novels by Fred Saberhagen, in which robotic self-replicating machines intend to destroy all life. These Berserkers, named after the human berserker warriors of Norse legend, are doomsday weapons left over from an interstellar war between two races of extraterrestrials.
 In the German science fiction series Perry Rhodan, the humanoid Arkoniden (English: Arconides) had the Arkon Bomb, which could destroy an Earth-sized planet within hours, or the Lemurians, the ancestors of the Arconides and the Terrans, had the Armageddon Bomb which was similar to the Arkon Bomb. The tyrannical rulers of the Andromeda Galaxy had planet killers, which could devour whole planets and were referred to as "Mobies" by the fictional characters within the series. In this series, weapons with the power to eliminate whole galaxies were mentioned as well.
 In A Hole in Space by Larry Niven, Monk ships carry a stern-facing device called the hachiroph shisp which causes stars to go supernova. The Monks use these devices to propel their ships from star to star, unless the star they are visiting has a civilization that can build a launching laser for them to use instead.
 Hypernet gates in The Lost Fleet explode when disrupted, with a yield ranging from insignificant to supernova-level depending on the order in which the gate's many "tethers" are destroyed. The alien Enigmas provided the technology to humans during a large war, hoping that humanity would destroy itself when the warring factions (the Alliance and the Syndicate) discovered the gate-collapse technique and began using it on each other.
 In The Shiva Option, the Bug "home hive" systems are neutralized by carpet bombing their inhabited planets with antimatter munitions.
 In The Mortal Engines Quartet by author Philip Reeve, set in a post-apocalyptic world, the ODIN device is an ancient orbital energy weapon capable of destroying whole cities in a single blast. Stalker Fang, a main character in the series, plans to use ODIN to target volcanoes to plunge the Earth into a volcanic winter to extinguish humanity, which she sees as responsible for all of Earth's problems.

The E.C.Tubb story 'Little Girl Lost' (also, a filmed adaptation was done for USA TV Series NIGHT GALLERY) presents a scenario where a researcher, working on atomic weapons (in the TV adaptation, he is working for the US, in the original, for the British government) suffers a nervous breakdown when his daughter is killed in a car accident. In order to keep him working at his project, a psychologist is brought in to keep him in a delusional state, thinking that she is still alive ... it seems that he is completely fooled by this ruse until the end, where it is discovered that his weapon can (and does) destroy the planet, or at least that is implied ...

▪ Stephan Ames Berry Kronarian book series has two versions of planet busters one produced by the old imperium burrows into a planets cores and explodes destroying the planet from the inside out. The other was produced by the Trel called a worm maker creates a wormhole to consume a planet or in some cases whole solar systems. this one was copied by the antagonist AI's and was used against them destroying their fleet.

Games

Halo series

 UNSC NOVA Bomb (a group of nuclear warheads clustered around a core that forces the fissionable material together, magnifying the explosion)
 Covenant Warships are typically equipped with plasma weapons used to vitrify (commonly called "glassing") the surface of a planet through en masse bombardment

The titular Halo installations themselves only kill sentient life, leaving planets and their biospheres-as well as any creature without sufficient biomass to support The Flood-otherwise intact. However, Forerunner and ancient Human fleets are known to possess less selective weapons capable of inducing stellar collapses at will.

StarCraft (series)

 Protoss:
 Most larger warcraft (carriers, motherships), and sometimes void rays have purification beams, which instantly vitrify (AKA glassing) the surface of a planet.
 Cybros, the Purifier vault/battlestation is equipped with a beam that "purifies" a planet of all life via glassing with one shot, hence the name Purifiers. This weapon was fired upon Endion after Cybros was cleansed of Zerg infestation.
Terrans:
 Bombardment with apocalypse class nukes, FTL-capable nukes meant to be launched en-masse. 1000 is extreme overkill for wiping out all life on a fortified planet, with explosions easily visible from orbit. This appears to leave little lingering radiation, as the planet Korhal which was victim to such an attack was cleansed of it and has a population in the billions within a few decades.
 The Mercer-class doomsday device, which turns a planet's core against it, causing it to explode, covering the planet's surface in magma.
Psi-emitter- a device that attracts innumerable Zerg to its location. One such device was deployed on Tarsonis, which resulted in massive casualties.
Zerg:
Although not shown in-game, it is referenced in the lore that the Zerg can spread creep across the surface of a planet within days. They have massive reproduction and regeneration capabilities, so they can clear a planet and assimilate any genetic code that benefits the Swarm.
Void Entities:
Amon is shown to be powerful enough to extinguish worlds with but a thought.

Sins of a Solar Empire

The TEC's Novalith Cannon is a giant, nuke launching, railgun capable of wiping out the entire population of a planet in just one shot, with better fortified planets only requiring two. The intense radiation of the nukes also makes the planet uninhabitable for a long time.
In Sins of a Solar Empire: Rebellion the loyalist faction of the alien Vasari can strip-mine an entire planet, leaving only a dead asteroid. This nets the player ordering the strip-mining a large amount of resources.
All titans, all capitals, and some specialized frigates can bomb a planet to destroy a colony and wipe out its population. the technology used varies between the different races, with the human TEC (or Trader Emergency Coalition) using nukes, the psychic Advent using Kinetic bombardment, and the alien Vasari using a beam weapon.

Warhammer 40,000

 Abaddon the Despoiler's ship, Planet Killer destroys planets through a concentrated beam that bores through a planet's crust causing a catastrophic eruption of planetary material.
 C'tan (the Necron's Gods). In their original "energy-like" form they can feed off any source of energy (heat, radiation, life, etc.)
 The Necron World Engine has large Gauss weapons that can scour a world of all life.
 Tyranid Hive Fleets devour all biomass of a planet they conquer.
 The Imperium's means of carrying out an order of Exterminatus, including:
 Virus Bombs. These contain a mutating virus, called the Life Eater virus, which causes basic chemical bonds in organic and some non-organic materials to break, causing these materials to "liquefy". As the planetary biosphere undergoes accelerated decomposition the massive amount of methane gas can be ignited from orbit creating a planet wide firestorm that will often kill anyone who survived the virus attack. 
 Cyclonic Torpedoes. One was used by the Inquisition to destroy Typhon Primaris during Warhammer 40,000: Dawn of War II - Retribution.
 Orbital Bombardment. The favored method of the Imperial Navy due to its lack of authorization to use the more advanced means. The result of an orbital bombardment can range from continents being atomized and oceans being vaporized to the complete mass scatter of the planet. 
 Two Blackstone Fortresses, a type of space station used by Chaos, can destroy a planet. If used together, Three Blackstone Fortresses or more can destroy a star. They were originally weapons wielded by the Eldar against the Necrons and the C'tan in a cataclysmic war but were lost and forgotten until millennia later. Initially used as Imperial Space Fortresses, the Chaos Warmaster Abaddon managed to secure two artifacts to control two Fortresses while destroying the rest.

Stellaris

 The Apocalypse DLC allows players to build a Colossus, a massive spaceship that can destroy planets or do other things based on what the player equips it with.
 The Nemesis DLC's Star-Eaters,massive ships constructed out of dark matter which destroy stars by causing them to go supernova, destroying all planets in the system and causing the star to become a black hole in order to harvest dark matter.
 The Aetherophasic Engine, also introduced in the Nemesis DLC, is a megastructure constructed through dark matter. Upon activation, its creators ascend to the "Shroud", a higher dimension of pure energy, while simultaneously destroying all stars in the galaxy along with their planets.

Other games
 The System Killer as well as the Von Neumann Construct random menaces from the Sword of the Stars series.
 The Annihilaser from Planetary Annihilation. It is used by building 5 massive Catalysts on the north pole of a metal planet, allowing the player to fire a weapon from the planet. After a short charging up sequence, the planet will rotate to its target and fire an extremely powerful beam of energy that goes straight though the planet, and the crust will turn bright blue and expand outward, before exploding. The Annihilaser can destroy any rocky planet (Regardless of size), and can even destroy small planets that are being fired at another planet. It cannot destroy gas giants or stars.
 Ragnarok, Planetary Annihilation. A doomsday structure that once built deploys and drills a hole to the mantle of a planet for one minute before dropping an unnamed device into the core, exploding the planet in a fashion similar to the Annihilaser. 
 The Planet Buster in E.A.'s 2008 space simulation game, Spore (Space stage), a superweapon feared by all, capable of destroying an entire planet with a single blast. Using it is against the Galactic Code and nearby empires will consider it to be an act of war, except the Grox, who become friendlier. When used 10 parsecs away from other empires, it will not alter the relationship with them and can be tested 'safely'.
Another planet-killer in Spore are the terraforming tools. While unable to completely shatter a planet, they can destroy the ecosystem and either freeze or melt the planet, while making the atmosphere too thin or thick for life to live.
Also in Spore, using the Fanatical Frenzy ability (Only available to Zealots) instantly wipes out a race and replaces its residents with yours. Again, it doesn't destroy the planet, but instantly conquers it. (Like the Planet Buster, it also breaks Galactic Code)
The Gravitation Wave, from Spore, (Only available to Scientists ) is a wave of very tightly packed gravity, that instantly kills all sapient beings on the planet and destroys their buildings. it does not alright destroy a planet, but kills all of its citizens. (It also breaks Galactic Code)
 Hammer of Dawn in the Gears of war Series could wipe out the entire civilization with a few shots.
 Xenon Mothership (X: Beyond the Frontier)
 Khaak Mothership (X²: The Threat)
 Heartless (Kingdom Hearts series), a race of creatures that devour, not only the hearts of people, but also of worlds, thus destroying them.
 Mycon Deep children, the Utwig Bomb, and the Sa-Matra from Star Control 2
 The Omega System (Xenosaga)
Tiberium in the Command & Conquer franchise slowly eats the Earth turning it into tiberium.
 Atmospheric deprivation missiles in Homeworld are used by the Taiidan (or Kushan, depending on the player's choice of race), while (unknown to them) the Mothership was held up by raiders on the outskirts of the system. Afterwards, the northern hemisphere was blackened and fires were visible from high orbit. In Homeworld 2, the main antagonists (the Vaygr) attempt to use similar technology in the final mission – one of the mission's objectives is to intercept the missiles before they reach their target. However, the planet is not 'killed' after one missile strike; each missile kills approximately half of the current surviving population, and the mission is failed if too many slip by (it takes approximately 5 to fully depopulate the planet). The T-MAT Motherships and the Progenitor ship, the Sajuuk, and the Ancient Planetary Bombardment Platforms are also considered as Planet Killers.
 Black Sun (Supreme Commander), an extremely powerful laser weapon that utilizes a gate network to target and burn multiple planets in a single firing. Fired from the Black Sun facility located on the island of Niihau in Hawaii.
 Mechanoid motherships (Rifts)
 Jenova in Final Fantasy VII, a parasitic being which drains life from any planet that it lands on. Described by Vincent Valentine as being "Heaven's Dark Arbiter."
 Meteor (Final Fantasy VII); the intention of its caller in the game required the Planet to survive.
 Shivan Juggernaut Sathanas could, as a group, create a gigantic ripple in the subspace field surrounding a star, causing the star to become unstable and go nova, ostensibly destroying all planets in the system. (FreeSpace 2)
 Shivan Super Destroyer Lucifer used three "flux cannons", which are more popularly known as "beams", to obliterate the surface of an entire planet, rendering it invulnerable. However, in the cutscene, the Lucifer used only one, which could release an expansive blast which could burn away a small fraction of a planet. (Descent: FreeSpace — The Great War)
 Star Generator (Space Quest 1)
 Stellar Converters (Master of Orion II: Battle at Antares), plasma cannons of immense size and power that are capable of tearing straight through virtually anything in the line of fire.
 The Kilrathi Dreadnought Sivar (Wing Commander: The Secret Missions) - This warship designed by the Kilrathi carried with it the Graviton Weapon, which could destroy a planet and all life on its surface by increasing its gravitational field 137 times the normal force.
 TCS Behemoth and the Temblor Bomb (Wing Commander III) - The TCS Behemoth was a super-heavy dreadnought which carried a superlaser capable of obliterating any target ranging from a starship to a planet. The latter weapon, the Temblor Bomb was designed to exploit the instability of a planet's fault line to trigger a super earthquake that would subsequently destabilize a world's entire tectonic makeup, literally shaking it apart to the point of implosion. The Temblor Bomb could only be launched via starfighter, and the player must destroy the Kilrathi homeworld of Kilrah by this means.
 Terror Star, a parody of the Death Star (although a fully functional star killer) from Galactic Civilizations
 The "Iron Helix" (used to destroy Calliope if you fail the mission)
 The "Nova Bomb" in X-COM: Interceptor – this was a missile carried on fighters which, rather than being used against a planet directly, was fired at the star inside the system. According to in-game details, the Nova Bomb slowly accelerates to light speed and burrows itself into the core, causing the star to go supernova, completely destroying the whole system. After the Doomsday Weapon built by the aliens is located (on the other side of a black hole), the player is told that it can only be destroyed with a Nova Bomb. The technology was considered so dangerous the scientific community asked for all knowledge of the bomb to be stricken from records so it would not fall into the wrong hands.
 The "Weak nuclear force decoupler" from Perfect Dark (Nintendo 64)
 The Space Colony ARK's Eclipse Cannon from Sonic Adventure 2 and Shadow the Hedgehog
 The Alphacore (Omega Boost)
 The Biologic Space Labs research station in Metroid Fusion (Game Boy Advance) is equipped with a self-destruct system capable of destroying a planet within its blast radius. In addition, the planet Zebes was equipped with a planetary self-destruct mechanism in Super Metroid (Super Nintendo Entertainment System)
 The Black Egg and Mulligan artifacts (Starflight)
 The Crest of Annihilation (Star Ocean: The Second Story) (this device completely obliterates a planet, but it is allegedly powerful enough to wipe out the entire known universe)
 The Death Egg from Sonic the Hedgehog 2 and Sonic & Knuckles, a parody of the Death Star and a caricature of Dr. Robotnik. Armed with two ion cannons (supposedly) forming the "eyes" on the "face", it is damaged and repaired throughout the early Sonic the Hedgehog series.
 The Galactic Implosion Device (Total Annihilation)
 The 'PlanetBuster Maximus' in the video game Ratchet & Clank, a skyscraper-sized bomb "capable of reducing an entire planet to subatomic particles". There was another device named 'The DePlanetizer', referred to as "The most powerful laser ever invented". It consisted of a giant football field-sized platform with a large rotating laser cannon on the bottom and a giant red button on the top. It served as an arena during the final fight with Chairman Drek. The De-Planetizer's purpose was to break planets apart so that Chairman Drek could harvest choice fragments to assemble into his own new planet.
 The Ragnarok space station is capable of destroying anything off of the face of the Earth. (Mega Man Zero)
 The Monitor Kernel Access / Monika.chr computer program, who destroys the virtual world of Doki Doki Literature Club! to protect the world at large from her fellow programs once they too begin to gain sentience. (Doki Doki Literature Club!)
 The Moon Dagger from Terminal Velocity. This largue warship is a huge missile that cycles on the target a Fussion Transference Wave, whose effects are described as similar to what a sawed-off shotgun causes to a human.
 The trih xeem in the Marathon Trilogy. Name literally means, "early nova."
 The Void (Super Paper Mario) (this consumes worlds completely, leaving bleak, endless white plains in their place)
 Vegnagun in (Final Fantasy X-2) can be seen instigating the destruction of Spira in a "bad ending".
 Smoke's Destroy-The-Earth fatality and Grey-Goo ending (Mortal Kombat)
 Planet Busters of (Sid Meier's Alpha Centauri) destructive power ranges from destroying a city to a continent depending on their power source. When used, these weapons increased the chance of the planet's native life seeking to annihilate humanity. In the novelizations, four gravitational singularity–powered Planet Busters used by the Believer's trigger such an event.
 Cannon Seed (Galaxian 3)
 Sorcery Globe (Star Ocean: The Second Story) disrupts a planets 'Expel's' orbit and causes it to crash into Energy Nede.
 The USG Ishimura in Dead Space, a deep space mining vessel that extracts minerals from a planet by ripping away large chunks of the crust, and the other planet cracker vessels built after it. The Ishimura herself is said to have cracked 34 planets during her 62-year service. Also, the pre-Ishimura space stations used to "harvest" Titan. 
In Dead Space 3 it is found out that if the alien Necromorph markers convert all the planet's life into more Necromorph mass, the planet becomes a Brethren moon, a sentient planet size Necromorph that has the ability of interstellar travel and the telepathic powers of the markers who consumes all life on other planets.
The Parasite Machine that sucks energy from the Earth's core in Urban Assault
In Mass Effect, mass accelerators are the primary weapon design, ranging from small arms to multi-kilometer capital ship cannons. One weapon's projectile was powerful enough for a glancing blow to result in a large rift on a planet's surface, comparable to Valles Marineris. Also, various planet-grade WMDs are listed: nuclear weapons of varying yield, asteroids and space stations, and invasive species. Mass Effect: Bring Down the Sky DLC has a state sponsored terrorist group attempt to navigate an asteroid into a Human colony. Mass Effect 2: Arrival DLC offers an unusual form of kinetic weaponry: an asteroid equipped with a propulsion drive with enough power to destroy mass relay. Mass Effect 3 involves disarming an old Turian bomb that was placed on the Krogan home world in case of a rebellion.
The Giant of Bab-il in Final Fantasy IV is teleported to the Blue Planet/Earth for the express purpose of annihilating all life on the planet.
In Final Fantasy V, Exdeath unleashes the power of the Void on the world; Neo-Exdeath (an amalgamation of Exdeath and all the creatures trapped in the Rift) clearly implies that the Void could destroy all life in the universe.
In Final Fantasy IX, Kuja destroys everything within his home planet with a Ultima spell.
In the original release of Final Fantasy XIV, the main antagonist Nael van Darnus pulls the lesser moon Dalamud from orbit in an attempt to destroy the beast tribes and the primals they worship. In reality, Dalamud is an artificial satellite used as a prison for the elder primal Bahamut, who destroys the world in a rage upon his release. The relaunched version and tts expansions expand upon this; Dalamud's fall and Bahamut's rampage were amplified by a phenomenon known as the Rejoining, in which the global story arc's antagonists, the Ascians, "rejoin" an alternate dimension split from the world, causing mass destruction and strengthening their god, Zodiark.
Capital Vessels in R-Type have Wave-Cannons stated to be a hundred million times the power of the standard mass-production fighter's, and capable of destroying planets. The in-game description therefore indicates that each of the dozens or hundreds of fighters fielded in every fleet has a re-usable weapon with an output in the low Teratons.
 Izanami from the Blazblue series with the True Blazblue can turn most things on the planet to seither and render it a husk.
 Dinosaur Planet, which would later be called Sauria in Star Fox Adventures had a force so powerful to blow the planet apart and kill the entire Lylat System.
 The Destroyer is a massive golem in The Legend of Spyro: Dawn of the Dragon. It had the ability to form a wall of fire called the "Ring of Annihilation." Once completed the belt of fire would spread reducing the world into fire and ash.
 Ogame features the Death Star, by far the largest ship available, that can destroy moons depending on the size of each, as the chance that it will occur varies greatly (not planets).
 GURPS Spaceships presents the Relativistic kill vehicle Azrael, described as a large AI-controlled missile that impacts its target with a force of 42 million megatons -enough to trigger an extinction event-.
In Kirby Super Star Ultra, a warrior known as Galacta Knight makes his debut. He is referred to as the greatest warrior in the galaxy and a warrior who was sealed away because his power was too great, as mentioned by the Galactic Nova. He later appears in Kirby: Planet Robobot, in which he is summoned by Star Dream, who says: 'He may end up destroying a nearby planet or two, but such is life.'. This indicates that Galacta Knight could quite easily destroy up to two planetary bodies at a time.
Void Termina (Kirby Star Allies) is mentioned to be the Destroyer of Worlds on his splash screen. This can be shown to be a valid description when his death causes a supernova.
In the Traveller roleplaying game there is a highly advanced weapon called a planet buster.  It is believed to have been used by the ancients during the war that resulted in their extinction.  It is very difficult if not impossible to gain one of these in a normal game.<wiki.travellerrpg.com/Planet-buster>
 The Ruin in Starbound is an ancient and giant biological being capable of destroying planets,it loathes all life and tries to kill it all and it was controlled by Arsa Nox and is the final boss of the game
In Outer Wilds, the alien race known as the Nomai constructed a space station capable of prompting its parent star to go supernova, destroying all planets within the blast. The Nomai would use the energy released to power the Ash Twin Project, sending a user's memories back in time 22 minutes. The Ash Twin Project was also linked to a probe cannon looking for a distant body known as the Eye. Sending the memories of the users and the data from the probe back in time allowed the probe to be fired an indefinite number of times, and for the loop to stop in the case of an emergency. Once the Ash Twin Project succeeded, it could tell the sun station to stop firing allowing the Nomai to find a way to travel to the Eye. However, the Sun Station did not output enough power to cause a supernova, and the Ash Twin Project would have to wait until the end of the Sun's natural life cycle to begin a time loop. At the end of Outer Wilds, the player does not find a way to stop the supernova, and must travel to the Eye, having deactivated the Ash Twin Project, using an ancient crashed ship whom the Nomai originated from. After a while, the Universe dies from heat death as all stars reach their deaths and go supernova, destroying all solar systems in the Universe, except for the Eye situated far enough from the blast of the Sun.
Also in Outer Wilds, interrupting a warp when there's still a duplicate of an object from the future will cause spacetime to break, presumably causing everything to cease existence.
In Fortnite Battle Royale, during the Chapter 2 Season 2 live event, the character of Midas builds a Doomsday Device in order to push back the storm from the loop, attempting to allow the loopers (players) to escape. The device fails, and the storm is turned into a gigantic tsunami.
Also in Fortnite Battle Royale, during the Chapter 3 Season 2 live event, the Imagined Order create a Doomsday Device in order to put an end to The Seven and restart the loop. They are stopped by The Paradigm controlling the rebuilt Mecha Team Leader while players control the guns of the mech.

Anime and manga

Dragon Ball

Many characters in the series can destroy planets.

Both Master Roshi and Piccolo destroyed the Moon in seconds. The former during the 21st Tenkaichi Budokai, and the latter in the Sayian Saga.
 Vegeta destroyed Planet Arlia in Dragon Ball Z filler.
 Frieza has destroyed Planet Vegeta, Planet Namek, and Earth.
 Kid Buu destroyed Earth during the climax of Dragon Ball Z and then destroys multiple other planets while trying to find Goku and Vegeta.
 In Dragon Ball Z: Battle of Gods and the Dragon Ball Super anime, Beerus, the God of Destruction of 7th Universe, destroys planets as a way to prevent overpopulation.
 Champa, the God of Destruction of 6th Universe, destroyed several planets with just kicks and punches while chasing his twin brother Beerus. The two are forbidden to engage in physical combat as prolonged combat will destroy both Universes 6 and 7.
 Vados destroyed a planet by tapping her sceptre in space, in the Dragon Ball Super anime.
 Zamasu destroyed all seven planet-sized Super Dragon Balls in the I anime.
 The original Broly was shown to destroy a planet with ease and destroyed a galaxy in beginning of Broly – The Legendary Super Saiyan.
 As a child, Son Gohan destroys the Makyo Star, (a star or planet that gives Garlic Jr. extra power) in anime filler.

Kiddy Grade

 Geo-Sort technology has the ability to reconfigure large amounts of matter at the molecular level; thus it can not only destroy entire planets, but make hostile planets habitable through terraforming.
 The Deucalion presumably has this capability as well, since it is outfitted with Geo-Sort technology (but this is never demonstrated in the series).

Sailor Moon

 One of the Outer Senshi, Sailor Saturn, can destroy an entire planet by just dropping her weapon (the Silence Glaive) with the intent to destroy, no attack calling necessary.
 Sailor Galaxia is also able to point at a planet and, if she possesses the will to, completely destroy it.
 The main protagonist, Sailor Moon (as Neo Queen Serenity), possesses the power to destroy an entire solar system, including its star.

Gall Force

In the first 3 Gall Force movies both sides the Solnoid and Paranoid Axis forces have had both their home worlds destroyed in a war of mutual assured destruction. They plan on using the last of their planet destroyers and include the new system destroyers in their final battle plans.

Gurren Lagann

The main antagonist, the Anti-Spiral, is shown to have destroyed many planets, stars, and galaxies. In the second film adaptation, an entire universe is destroyed in the Anti-Spiral's clash with the similarly powerful Super Tengen Toppa Gurren Lagann.

Tenchi the Movie: Tenchi Muyo in Love

In the final battle with Kain, who is apparently powerful enough to destroy a planet on his own. Washu decides to have Kiyone make use of a "Dimensional Cannon". In spite of Kiyone's protests that you shouldn't even use it on a city because it is made for taking out small galaxies.

Space Battleship Yamato (Star Blazers)

Throughout the series and movies, including Rebirth and the recent live action film, the Yamato (Argo) and similar battleships in the Earth Defense Force are armed with a Wave Motion Gun. This weapon of last resort is capable of obliterating entire fleets in one shot, as well as most moon and planetary sized objects. The downside of using this weapon is that it leaves the ship defenseless before and after firing due to the massive amount of energy needed to fire it (except in Rebirth, where the ship could fire six shots without recharging.) Also included would be the Desler (Desslok) cannon, built on the same principle (Tachyon Compression), and the main cannon in Zordar's dreadnaught, which was deployed at the end of season 2.

In the remake Star Blazers: Space Battleship Yamato 2202 the White Comet of the Gatlantis Empire is a planet killing weapon, that captures and destroy a planet's biosphere.

Eureka seveN

At the end of the series, it is established that the Coralians have the ability to engulf a planet and form their own version of a planetary crust, although they did not exercise it with the purpose of making a planet uninhabitable.

The End of Evangelion

At the end of the movie, the Human Instrumentality Project is carried out and the Human race is combined into one shared consciousness.

Comics

DC Comics
 Superboy Prime destroyed Earth-15 in Countdown to Final Crisis, Issue #24
 Superman destroyed several replica planets in Shadows Linger Part Two: The Long Road, Volume 1 Issue #675. In the alternate universe Injustice storyline, during the final battle against the Green Lantern Corps at the end of Year Two, Superman killed Mogo, the living planet, by throwing it into the Sun.

Other media
 Buster Machine III, aka the Black Hole Bomb in Gunbuster uses the mass of a gas giant planet (specifically, Jupiter) to create a black hole which ultimately destroys the center of the Milky Way galaxy.
 Galactus, a being from the Marvel Comics Universe, specifically the Fantastic Four books, consumes planets for their energy in order to sustain himself. He is often aided in this process by one of his heralds, the most famous among them being the Silver Surfer. His name is given to Galactus Syndrome. His daughter Galacta is capable of doing the same. Also, there exists a great number of characters capable of planet busting.
 In DC Comics, the Warworld is a planet killer. As in Marvel, there is a great number of characters who can destroy planets.
 In the Marvel Comics Universe there exists the Godkiller, which destroys planets by flying through them without slowing down - presumably as an incidental side-effect of performing its main function - killing Celestials.
 Big Venus (The Big O).
 Serpentera from Power Rangers.
 Erdammeru the Void-Hound (DC Comics)
 In Getter Robo Armageddon, the protagonists manage to create a massive Getter Beam Tomahawk powerful enough to slice through planets. Likewise, in some Getter Robo manga, an entire fleet of impossibly enormous Getter Emperors exist. These super-mecha are so large, they create their own gravity field that can actually shatter planets as they pass.
 In Vandread, A special variant of harvest ship can destroy planets that are not needed by Earth anymore.
 In the Eek! The Cat episode Eek vs. The Flying Saucers, aliens called Zoltarians threaten to blow up the Earth using a death ray powered by Eek's 300-pound girlfriend, Annabelle, and want to do so because Earth "obstructs our view of Uranus."
 In the Exosquad episode A Night Before Doomsday an antimatter bomb capable of destroying all life on Earth is revealed and its activation by the Neosapien leader Phaeton dying of Automutation Syndrome is prevented in the episode Abandon Hope.
 In Chodenji Machine Voltes V, a Magmite bomb was planted by general Oslack to destroy the Earth.
 In the cartoon Invader Zim, the Planet Jackers tried to feed the Earth to their sun to keep it from going out.
 In Gunbuster, Buster Machine #7 and #19 work in tandem to destroy an Earth-sized life form and a black hole which it carries in tow.
 In Gunbuster's sequel series: Diebuster, the android Buster Machine #7 splits the moon Titan in half.
 The Super Robot Mazinkaiser is said to be capable of blasting a hole right down to a planet's core with a full-powered Fire Blaster.
 The Vok second Moon (Beast Wars: Transformers) (could only destroy energon-rich worlds)
 The Annihilatrix from Frisky Dingo is designed to launch Earth into the Sun. Designed being the operative word. In the end it manages to push Earth out of its orbit - into an orbit that is further from the sun. One foot further.
 The Beast Planet in Shadow Raiders.
 The Desiccator in Dark Reign.
 The Ideon Sword (capable of slicing a planet in half) and the Ideon Gun (capable of cutting large swaths of destruction encompassing thousands of ships and celestial bodies) from Space Runaway Ideon. In addition, when ultimately destroyed, the resulting force caused by the detonation of its power source could potentially destroy the universe.
 The Planet and System Killers in Gall Force.
 The Dark Heart in Justice League Unlimited.
 In the Macross Saga segment of Robotech, when the entire Zentradi main fleet was brought together it could destroy the entire surface of a planet through large bombardments of its energy weapons. In Robotech continuity, the Neutron-S missile is thought to be an extremely powerful bomb, but it turns out to be a planet killer since it creates artificial singularities and hence turns any target into a black hole.
 Rave Master describes two powers capable of wiping out all life: the power of Etherion contained in the body of Elie and the being called Endless.
 The largely undescribed cascade missile in Sluggy Freelance (in the science fiction parody in chapter 24, "GOFOTRON Champion of the Cosmos"). It is designed to destroy a single planet, but it is theorized that firing it into a star could initiate a chain reaction capable of destroying all life in the entire universe.
 In the Manga Keroro Gunsou, there is a character who is related to Keroro who can destroy planets.
 The Colonization Industrial Companies' wormhole in Universal War One, able to split a planet in half
 The Stöah in the Kobaïan mythos of French zeuhl concept band Magma.
 The Planet Smasher in the Devin Townsend concept albums Ziltoid the Omniscient and Dark Matters.
Orion's Arm features many weapons capable of destroying planets, including Nicoll-Dyson beams which use the entire surface of a Dyson sphere as a laser emitter, relativistic impactors of many kinds, archailect-built "metric weapons" which disrupt space itself, and construction fleets capable of disassembling planet-sized objects for raw materials.

Secondary literature 
In his discussion of the tradition of apocalyptic cinema Mitchell exemplifies what the film Doomsday Machine or Escape from Planet Earth characterizes as a "planet-buster"
as belonging to the class of "Doomsday device". Secondary literature can also use terms like "planet-cracker" or "planet-busting superweapon".

Science journalism 

In the field of science journalism, a 1962 article examined various means "to put an end to the world", concentrating on "Doomsday Bombs".

As astronomer Phil Plait has pointed out, the amount of energy necessary to shatter an Earth-sized planet is extremely large: "about 2 x 1032 Joules.... about as much energy as the sun puts out in a week."

See also 
 Apocalyptic science fiction
 Doomsday device

References

External links 
 "Qntm" (3 April 2003).  "How to Destroy the Earth". qntm.org.  Viewed July 8, 2020.

 
Fictional spacecraft by type
Fiction about space warfare
Lists of fictional weapons
Science fiction weapons